Government Higher Secondary school Attenganam is an Educational Institution located at the town of Attenganam near Kanhangad. It is a much renowned school in Kasaragod district.

Schools in Kasaragod district